Thorpe Audlin is a civil parish in the metropolitan borough of the City of Wakefield, West Yorkshire, England.  The parish contains six listed buildings that are recorded in the National Heritage List for England.  All the listed buildings are designated at Grade II, the lowest of the three grades, which is applied to "buildings of national importance and special interest".  The parish contains the hamlet of Thorpe Audlin and the surrounding countryside.  The listed buildings consist of tow former manor houses, three farm buildings, and a milepost.


Buildings

References

Citations

Sources

Lists of listed buildings in West Yorkshire